Poddąbie  is a village in the administrative district of Gmina Ustka within Słupsk County, Pomeranian Voivodeship, in northwestern Poland. It is located on the Slovincian Coast in the historic region of Pomerania.

The village has a population of 39.

References

External links
[http://www.poddabie.info/] Strona www o Poddąbiu

Villages in Słupsk County
Populated coastal places in Poland
Seaside resorts in Poland